Apparition of Face and Fruit Dish on a Beach (1938) is a painting by the Spanish surrealist Salvador Dalí. This work belongs to a group of paintings by Dalí that instantiate an optical illusion called the double, multiple, or ambiguous image.

The painting is dominated by a depiction of brown-skinned pears with the eponymous footed silver fruit bowl, which somewhat resembles a wine glass (specifically a coupe). A deliberately created optical illusion of the eponymous human face occupies the same space as the dish; the fruits suggest wavy hair, the dish's bowl becomes the forehead, the stem of the dish serves as the bridge of the nose, and the dish's foot doubles as the chin. The eyes of the large face, however, are formed by background objects lying on the sand at the edge of the strand — deeper in the image — rather than sharing form with the fruit dish. The face's right eye is what appears to be a shell, and the face's left eye a piece of a ship or boat. A similar face reappears other paintings by Dalí, including The Endless Enigma.

In the middle ground of the scene, where the sand of the beach appears to end, a small version of the fruit dish can be seen on the ground with several pears scattered near it, all to the same scale as the only embodied human figures depicted in the painting. A second iteration of the face appears further in the distance, just to the right of the elbow of the nude male figure; in the same area of the painting, two dogs are playing along a path in the distance. One of those dogs is itself an echo of the immense, illusionary figure of a dog which stretches from the left to the right margin of the painting, with the dog's collar formed by a multi-arched bridge or aqueduct in the landscape beyond. This repetition of shapes is a frequent motif in Dalí's surrealist works.

Apparition of Face and Fruit Dish on a Beach is part of the Ella Gallup Sumner and Mary Catlin Sumner Collection of the Wadsworth Atheneum Museum of Art in Hartford, Connecticut.

References

External links
 Large image viewable via the online gift shop of the Wadsworth Atheneum

Paintings by Salvador Dalí
Surrealist paintings
1938 paintings
Dogs in art